Starship Troopers: The Roleplaying Game is a tabletop role-playing game produced by Mongoose Publishing in 2005. The game is based upon the 1959 book Starship Troopers by Robert A. Heinlein, but it is mostly based on its adaptations, Starship Troopers (1997) and Starship Troopers 2 (2004), and the cartoon series (Roughnecks: Starship Troopers Chronicles); the game itself was published under license of Sony Pictures. While it is impossible to seamlessly merge all three different interpretations, this RPG does not pick one over the other, instead merging the three as best it can.

There are two editions of the game; the original hardcover book, published in 2005; and a softcover pocket edition, published in 2006.

Published supplements 
Mongoose Publishing have released the following supplements:

 Starship Troopers RPG (2005)
 Starship Troopers RPG Pocket Edition (2006)
 Blaze of Glory 1: Alamo Bay (more novel than RPG supplement)
 Starship Troopers Floorplans
 The Selvache Incident
 Boot Camp
 The United Citizens' Federation
 The Arachnid Empire
 Mobile Infantry Field Manual
 Ambush at Altair

Mobile Infantry
In Starship Troopers: The Roleplaying Game, players play as units from the Mobile Infantry (though the ability to play as a Skinny is granted).

Mobile Infantry Classes
Mobile Infantry Trooper
Chaplain
Comms Trooper
Engineer
Field Medic
Hero of the Federation/Veteran
Light Armour Trooper
Marauder Driver
Neodog Handler
Officer Cadet
Pathfinder
Sniper

Other Classes
There are other classes in the game that players can play if they choose not to be in the Mobile Infantry.
Special Services Agent
Telepath
Memory Man
Lucky Man
Civilian
Fleet Officer
Skinny Raider

M.I. Equipment and Weapons
The weapons and equipment available in the game originate mainly from the movies, TV series, and the novel.  Some original equipment unique to the game was also added.

Aliens
In Starship Troopers: The Roleplaying Game, the players fight against the Arachnids and the Skinnies.  The Arachnids include the warriors depicted in the novel as well as the diverse sub-species portrayed in the films and TV series.  The Skinnies are primarily based on their depiction in the Roughnecks TV series, and are a playable race.

Second Edition
The Starship Troopers Role-Playing Game was in the process of being redone using the rule set from the Traveller Role-Playing Game. It would have featured all previously revealed races plus several new ones (Terrans, Arachnids, Skinnies, the Forth, and the Coven). However Mongoose has since lost the license to Starship Troopers; as such, the game will not be re-released under the new rule set as originally planned.

See also
Bug (Starship Troopers)

References

External links 
 Starship Troopers RPG at Mongoose Publishing

British role-playing games
Games based on Starship Troopers
Military role-playing games
Mongoose Publishing games
Role-playing games based on novels
Role-playing games introduced in 2005
Science fiction role-playing games

fr:Starship Troopers (jeu de rôle)